Safari TV Channel is an Indian non-profit television channel broadcasting in Malayalam language. It is an exploration channel based in Marangattupilly, Kottayam, Kerala. The channel is part of Safari Multimedia Pvt.Ltd, India. 
A TV channel running without advertising, Safari TV does not accepting ads.

Safari showcases the world through travelogues, explorations and programs highlighting history.

Safari TV Channel has production facilities and studios in Marangattupilly and Marine Drive, Ernakulam.

History 
Safari TV was launched by Santosh George Kulangara on 1 November 2013.

Branding 
The Swahili word safari means journey. It originated from the Arabic word safar. These words became used for any type of journey.

The theme song, Neelakasha pookkal nullan was written by poet P K Gopi, composed and sung by Nandhu Kartha.

Programmes 
Safari TV presents diverse programmes that provide entertainment and knowledge. It offers a variety of genres including World travel, Indian travel, other journeys, history, geography, culture, movies, art and adventure.

Programmes include:

 Sancharam
 Oru Sanchariyude Diary Kurippukal
 The History of Cinema
 Around the World in 30 Minutes
 Charithram Enniloode
 History
 Opera House
 Charithram Chalachithram
 Animal Kingdom
 Movies on the Road
 Aa Yathrayil
 Location Hunt
 Smrithi
 World War II
 Irupathaam Noottandu
 Juthan
 Freedom At Midnight
 Club Class
 World Classics

Coverage 
Safari TV is available via (C-Band) INTELSAT- 17 satellite. Besides its audience among Malayalam-speaking people in Kerala and other regions of India, Safari's global footprint currently covers, Asia, Middle East, US, Australia and Europe. It is also accessible on internet and similar platforms.

References 

Malayalam-language television channels
2013 establishments in Kerala
Television channels and stations established in 2013
Television stations in Kerala
Kottayam